Brazilian-Cuban relations were described as "excellent" in May 2008 following a meeting of their foreign ministers. After the 1964 Brazilian coup, the military regime in Brazil severed diplomatic relations with Cuba, which were only restored after Brazil's redemocratization in 1986. During a January 2008 state visit to Cuba by Brazilian President Lula da Silva, the Brazilian leader expressed desire for his country to be Cuba's "number one partner".

After the election of Jair Bolsonaro in the 2018 Brazilian general election, relations between Cuba and Brazil worsened, exemplified by the cessation of the program agreed to by the governments of Dilma Rousseff and Raúl Castro for Cuban doctors to provide medical treatment to tens of millions of poor and indigenous Brazilians. President Bolsonaro ended the Mais Medicos (More Doctors) programme, and thousands of Cuban doctors left Brazil.

In addition, in November 2019, Brazil for the first time voted against an annual United Nations resolution condemning and calling for an end to the United States' economic embargo on Cuba.

References 

 
Cuba
Bilateral relations of Cuba